Learnium International School was located in Sri Lanka. It is an international school founded and run by Turkish and Sri Lankan citizens. One of the branches of Learnium is located in Rajagiriya and the other one is in Ward Place. It is expanding. This school has partner schools all around the world.
It is one of the most organized schools available in Sri Lanka

External links

 www.lis.lk site of school
 A reference
 article about the school

Educational institutions with year of establishment missing
International schools in Sri Lanka
Schools in Colombo